Greg Lourey (born 1 August 1927) is  a former Australian rules footballer who played with Melbourne and Fitzroy in the Victorian Football League (VFL).

Notes

External links 

1927 births
Living people
Australian rules footballers from Victoria (Australia)
Melbourne Football Club players
Fitzroy Football Club players